Tangará Esporte Clube, commonly known as Tangará, is a Brazilian football club based in Tangará da Serra, Mato Grosso state.

History
The club was founded on January 22, 1991. They competed in the Campeonato Mato-Grossense in 1994 and in 1995.

Stadium
Tangará Esporte Clube play their home games at Estádio Municipal de Tangará da Serra. The stadium has a maximum capacity of 5,000 people.

References

Association football clubs established in 1991
Football clubs in Mato Grosso
1991 establishments in Brazil